Vito Miceli (6 January 1916 – 1 December 1990) was an Italian general  and politician.

Biography 

Born in Trapani, he was a lieutenant of the Bersaglieri during the Second World War.

He was chief of the SIOS, the Italian Army Intelligence's Service from 1969 and, promoted to division general, the military intelligence service SID's head from October 18, 1970 to 1974.

Vito Miceli was arrested in October 1974 on charges of political conspiracy concerning investigations about the Golpe Borghese coup attempt. He was acquitted of any wrongdoing in 1978. Miceli received money in 1972 from the United States embassy in Rome. Ambassador Graham Martin turned $800,000 over to Miceli, as Italy's intelligence chief, with approval of the director of the National Security Council, Henry Kissinger, over the objections of the CIA Rome station chief. It is unknown how Miceli spent the money. Miceli was a member of the masonic Propaganda Due.

He later became a deputy of the Italian Parliament for the neo-fascist Italian Social Movement (1976–1987).

References

1916 births
1990 deaths
People from Trapani
Italian generals
Italian Social Movement politicians
20th-century Italian politicians
Italian anti-communists
Italian fascists